Metarranthis pilosaria, known generally as the coastal bog metarranthi or slender groundsel moth, is a species of geometrid moth in the family Geometridae. It is found in North America.

The MONA or Hodges number for Metarranthis pilosaria is 6830.

References

Further reading

 
 

Ennominae